Marcus Smith may refer to:
 Marcus Smith (defensive lineman, born 1984), American football defensive tackle
 Marcus Smith (rugby union) (born 1999), English rugby union player
 Marcus Smith (wide receiver) (born 1985), American football wide receiver
 Marcus Smith II (born 1992), American football defensive end
 Marcus A. Smith (1851–1924), United States Senator from Arizona
 Marcus C. Smith (1825–1900), American politician in Indiana
 Marcus G. Smith (born 1973), president and chief operating officer and director of NASCAR track owner Speedway Motorports, Inc.
 Sir Marcus Smith (judge), British judge

See also
Marc Smith (disambiguation)
Mark Smith (disambiguation)